Cry of the City is a 1948 American film noir starring Victor Mature, Richard Conte, and Shelley Winters. Directed by Robert Siodmak, it is based on the novel by Henry Edward Helseth, The Chair for Martin Rome. The screenwriter Ben Hecht worked on the film's script, but is not credited. The film was partly shot on location in New York City.

Siodmak later said "I thought it was good but it's not really my kind of film: I hate locations – there's so much you can't control".

Plot
Martin Rome (Richard Conte), a hardened criminal, is in a hospital room awaiting surgery for wounds he received in a shootout where he killed a police officer. At the hospital, he is visited by members of his family and his girlfriend, Teena Ricante (played by 14-year old Debra Paget), as well as by police detectives Candella (Victor Mature) and Collins (Fred Clark).  The officers question Rome about a jewel robbery and murder, for which another man has already been caught and sentenced to death.  Candella especially despises Rome for having turned to crime though they had been childhood friends from the same poor Italian-American neighborhood.  Rome is also visited by W.A. Niles (Berry Kroeger), a shady lawyer, who attempts to coerce Rome into confessing to the jewel robbery, threatening to harm Teena.  Rome reacts by trying to strangle the lawyer. Later, Rome charms his nurse, Miss Pruett (Betty Garde), into hiding Teena from Niles and the police at her own apartment.

After being transferred to the prison's hospital ward, Rome escapes with  the help of a trustee (Walter Baldwin).  Going to Niles' office to demand money to allow him and Teena to get away, Rome discovers the stolen jewels and makes Niles confess that the woman accomplice in the murder/robbery was a surly, heavy-set masseuse named Rose Givens (Hope Emerson).  When Niles goes for a gun, Rome knifes him to death - the resulting gunshot which accidentally kills Niles' receptionist, Vera, who was listening in the conversation in the outer office - and takes the jewels, concealing them in a locker in a subway station.

Rome, feverish and exhausted, goes to his parents' apartment.  Although Rome is rejected by his father, his teenage brother Tony (Tommy Cook) worships him. Their mother tells Rome he must leave, but while she is preparing him some food, Candella shows up.  As he is about to search the apartment, Rome appears holding a gun.  When Rome escapes, Candella has a talk with Tony, warning him about following in his brother's criminal ways.

Rome uses an old girlfriend, Brenda (Shelley Winters), to track down Rose Givens' address, but he is so weak that Brenda gets an unlicensed foreign doctor (Konstantin Shayne) to attend to him.  When Brenda finally drops Rome off at Rose Givens' address, he offers to give Rose the jewels that he took from Niles' office in exchange for "five thousand dollars, a car, a way out of the country and a good night's sleep".

At the police station, Candella and Collins question people who might have helped Rome to escape from the prison hospital and after, including the trustee from the prison, the man in charge of the hospital ward, and several unlicensed doctors.  One of those doctors is the veterinarian, who confesses to treating the wanted man.

Meanwhile, Rose has set out to get money and transportation for Rome, who double-crosses her by telephoning Candella to let him know that he will meet Rose at a subway station where the jewels are stored in a locker.  Rome meets Rose first and demands the cash she promised, but she demands to get the jewels first.  When the police arrive to take her, she tries to shoot Rome but wounds Candella instead.

Candella leaves the hospital where he was being treated to look for Teena, who might lead him to Rome.  He discovers that Teena has gone to a church, where Rome meets her. Teena, however, refuses to go away with Rome, and Candella arrives, persuading her to leave the church. As Candella arrests Rome and leads him out of the church, Rome, seeing that Candella is wounded and bleeding and would not be able to keep up to him in a chase, breaks away and runs down the street. Candella fires at the escaping criminal, killing him. Just arriving on the scene, Rome's brother Tony, who could not bring himself to steal money from their mother as Rome had asked, breaks down in tears.

Cast
 Victor Mature as Lt. Vittorio Candella
 Richard Conte as Martin Rome
 Fred Clark as Lt. Jim Collins
 Shelley Winters as Brenda Martingale
 Betty Garde as Nurse Frances Pruett
 Berry Kroeger as W. A. Niles
 Tommy Cook as Tony Rome
 Debra Paget as Teena Ricante
 Hope Emerson as Rose Givens
 Roland Winters as Ledbetter
 Walter Baldwin as Orvy
 June Storey as Miss Boone
 Tito Vuolo as Papa Rome
 Mimi Aguglia as Mama Rome
 Konstantin Shayne as Dr. Veroff
 Howard Freeman as Sullivan
 Joan Miller as Vera
 Dolores Castle as Rosa
 Kathleen Howard as Miss Pruett's Mother

Production
Director Robert Siodmak was loaned from Universal for this motion picture. Filming took place on location in New York originally under the title Law and Martin Rome.

Reception

At the time the film was released, The New York Times praised Cry of the City as "taut and grimly realistic". The review praised the performances as "thoroughly effective", and said that "Victor Mature, an actor once suspected of limited talents, turns in a thoroughly satisfying job as the sincere and kindly cop, who not only knows his business but the kind of people he is tracking down".

The staff at Variety magazine liked the film and wrote, "The hard-hitting suspense of the chase formula is given topnotch presentation in Cry of the City. It's an exciting motion picture, credibly put together to wring out every bit of strong action and tension inherent in such a plot. Robert Siodmak's penchant for shaping melodramatic excitement that gets through to an audience is realistically carried out in this one".

The film has been highly praised by modern critics, and is viewed as an important example of the film noir genre. The Time Out Film Guide praises the realistic look and feel of the city: "Rarely has the cruel, lived-in squalor of the city been presented in such telling detail, both in the vivid portrayal of ghetto life and in the astonishing parade of corruption uncovered in the night (a slug-like shyster; a monstrous, sadistic masseuse; a sleazy refugee abortionist, etc.)".

Raymond Borde and Etienne Chaumeton writing in A Panorama of American Film Noir 1941–1953 comments that director Siodmak had better noir efforts but the film does have one lasting image, "Siodmak will rediscover neither the brilliance of The Killers nor the 'finish' of Criss Cross in the over-rushed, too uneven, Cry of the City: for all that, one will remember the figure of a forever famished masseuse, a real 'phallic woman' who, with a flick of the wrists, has a 'tough guy' at her mercy".

In Film Noir: The Dark Side of the Screen, Foster Hirsch said that Siodmak's characters "are nurtured by their obsessions". The Candella character, "as Colin McArthur notes in Underworld USA, 'hunts his quarry with an almost metaphysical hatred'".

Hirsch describes Rome's innocence in the jewel robbery, despite his criminal background, as an "ironic variation on the wrong man theme" of some film noir movies. "Branded for a crime he did not commit, the Conte character becomes a true criminal, enmeshed in a web from which there is no escape".

Soundtrack
The musical score of the film is Alfred Newman's Street Scene, which had debuted in a 1931 movie of the same name and was heard in other big-city gangster pictures produced during that era.

References

Bibliography
 A Panorama of American Film Noir 1941–1953 by Raymond Borde and Etienne Chaumeton
 Film Noir: The Dark Side of the Screen by Foster Hirsch (Da Capo Press, 1983)

Notes

External links
 
 
 
 
 

1948 films
1948 crime drama films
American crime drama films
American black-and-white films
1940s English-language films
Film noir
Films set in the 1930s
Films set in the 1940s
Films set in New York City
Films shot in New York City
20th Century Fox films
Films directed by Robert Siodmak
Films with screenplays by Ben Hecht
Films scored by Alfred Newman
Films produced by Sol C. Siegel
1940s American films